Brunton House is a Category A listed building in the village of Falkland in Fife, Scotland. It was formerly the residence of the hereditary falconers to the Kings of Scotland.

It was built by the Sunsons of Brunton, Hereditary Falconers, whose arms are depicted on an armorial panel on the front of the building with the date 1712. It was restored in 1894–95 for the 3rd Marquess of Bute by Robert Weir Schultz as a school for the Roman Catholic children of the village, and restored again in 1970–71 by the National Trust for Scotland.

References

See also
Brunton House on the Falkland Historic Buildings website

Category A listed buildings in Fife
Listed houses in Scotland
Houses completed in 1895
Falkland, Fife